Jewish Quarter and St Procopius' Basilica in Třebíč is the official name of the UNESCO World Heritage site in Třebíč, Czech Republic.

It consists of: 
 the Jewish Quarter of Třebíč
 and the St. Procopius Basilica in Třebíč

References 

World Heritage Sites in the Czech Republic